Bristol Tennessee City Schools is a school district headquartered in Bristol, Tennessee. It includes almost all of the city limits of Bristol.

Gary Lilly served as superintendent from 2009, until he resigned in June 2019. Tom Sisk replaced him. The school board bought out Sisk's contract in 2020 when a revelation came that Sisk never received a PhD from an accredited institution even though he presented himself as having that credential. Annette Tudor became the interim superintendent.

Schools
 Secondary schools
Tennessee High School
Tennessee Middle School

Elementary schools
Anderson Elementary School
Avoca Elementary School
Fairmount Elementary School
Haynesfield Elementary School
Holston View Elementary School

See also
 Bristol Virginia Public Schools - School district of Bristol, Virginia

References

External links
 Bristol Tennessee City Schools
Education in Sullivan County, Tennessee
School districts in Tennessee